The 1996–97 2. Bundesliga season was the twenty-third season of the 2. Bundesliga, the second tier of the German football league system.

1. FC Kaiserslautern, VfL Wolfsburg and Hertha BSC were promoted to the Bundesliga while SV Waldhof Mannheim, VfB Lübeck, Rot-Weiss Essen and VfB Oldenburg were relegated to the Regionalliga.

League table
For the 1996–97 season VfB Oldenburg, Rot-Weiss Essen, FC Gütersloh and Stuttgarter Kickers were newly promoted to the 2. Bundesliga from the Regionalliga while 1. FC Kaiserslautern, Eintracht Frankfurt and KFC Uerdingen 05 had been relegated to the league from the Bundesliga.

Results

Top scorers
The league's top scorers:

References

External links
 2. Bundesliga 1996/1997 at Weltfussball.de 
 1996–97 2. Bundesliga  kicker.de

1996-97
2
Germany